The word city took on two meanings in New Zealand after the local government reforms of 1989. Before the reforms, a borough that had a population of 20,000 or more could be proclaimed a city. The boundaries of councils tended to follow the edge of the built-up area, so there was little difference between the urban area and the local government area. In 1989, the structure of local government in New Zealand was significantly reorganised. Almost all the new district councils and city councils were much larger in land area, and they covered both urban land and the surrounding rural land. Many locations that once had a "city council" are now governed by a "district council". Since 2002 an urban area must have at least 50,000 residents to be proclaimed a city.

The word city is used in a general sense to identify the urban areas of New Zealand, independent of local body boundaries. This informal usage is jealously guarded. The district government of the town of Gisborne, for example, adamantly described itself as the first "city" in the world to see the new millennium. However, Gisborne is governed by a "district council", though its status as a city is not generally disputed in New Zealand. Similarly, there is no "city council" in Auckland, though its status as a city is not generally disputed due to its size.

Listed below are the large urban areas referred to colloquially as "cities".

Urban areas by population

Urban areas based on 2018 standard
Statistics New Zealand creates standards for statistical geographic areas that are the basis for determining population figures. Statistics New Zealand announced in 2017 that the Statistical Standard for Geographic Areas 2018 (SSGA18) would replace the New Zealand Standard Areas Classification 1992 (NZSAC92). The change impacted Wellington most, by splitting it into four urban areas, being the Wellington city and Lower Hutt city "major urban areas" and Porirua and Upper Hutt "large urban areas". Wellington as defined by Statistics New Zealand approximately halved in size, and Lower Hutt entered the city rankings in sixth place between Tauranga and Dunedin. 

The table below contains all "major urban areas" (100,000 or more residents) and all "large urban areas" (30,000 to 99,999 residents). The urban area that will next move from the "medium urban area" category to the "large urban area" category is Paraparaumu.

Functional urban areas (metropolitan areas)
Functional urban areas (FUAs) are geographic areas which represent the functional extent of major, large and medium urban areas, based on commuting patterns. Functional urban areas correspond to New Zealand's metropolitan areas.

FUA populations are as at the 2018 Census.

City councils

Populations of present-day city (and Auckland) councils 
The populations given are the latest  Statistics New Zealand estimated resident populations.

Many cities were reorganised into districts by the Local Government Commission in 1989 under the Local Government Act 1974, for example Timaru. Other urban areas that are no longer cities, such as Rotorua and Whangārei, have higher populations than some present cities. The most recently proclaimed city is Tauranga, which became a city, for the second time, from 1 March 2004. Christchurch (1862 and 1868) and Invercargill (1930 and 1991) have also been declared cities more than once.

Under Section 27 of the Local Government Act 2002, a district may become a city by either a "reorganisation scheme" with the Local Government Commission, or under Section 27(1) it may apply for a change in status under Schedule 3, Clause 7. The new city must have "a population of not less than 50,000 persons", be "predominantly urban" and "a distinct entity and a major centre of activity within the region" (or regions) that it is encompassed by. Existing cities are grandfathered under Schedule 2, Part 2 of the Act. The only new city council so far under this section is the Tauranga City Council, from 1 March 2004.

Previously, under Section 37L of the Local Government Act 1974, new cities could only be formed from a "reorganisation scheme". The same criteria were used. The last city to be constituted under this section was Invercargill, which was re-reorganised into a city in 1991.

In 1991 the Lower Hutt City Council became the Hutt City Council by a special Act of Parliament  which did not change the name  of the city of Lower Hutt; the city's coat of arms still refers to the "City of Lower Hutt".

Cities during provincialism, 1852 to 1876 
During provincialism in New Zealand, from 1852 until abolition in 1876, there was no uniform system of local authorities in New Zealand. There is thus some argument over which of the following cities was the first.

Nelson (1858, by Letters Patent)
Christchurch (November 1862, revoked June 1868, both by provincial ordinance, and restored October 1868 by Act of Parliament)
Otago (later Dunedin) (July 1865)

The Municipal Corporations Act 1876 included the first schedule of cities, with the dates they were constituted. Dunedin was the first city in New Zealand to be described in an Act of Parliament as 'City of...', something now automatic under the Local Government Act 2002.

Dunedin (4 July 1865)
Christchurch (28 May 1868)
Wellington (16 September 1870)
Auckland (24 April 1871)
Nelson (30 March 1874)

Cities, 1877 to 1989 
Up to October 1989, the Local Government Commission under took reorganisations of local government. As a result, some cities were reorganised into other larger cities or changed to districts, and some of these areas are still considered cities by many New Zealanders. This is a list as at circa 1986.

 North Island
 Whangārei (1964)
 Auckland
 Auckland (1871)
 East Coast Bays
 Takapuna
 Birkenhead
 Waitemata (1974)
 Mt Albert
 Papatoetoe
 Manukau (1965)
 Papakura
 Tāmaki
 Hamilton (1936)
 New Plymouth (1949)
 Tauranga (1963) (lost city status 1989, regained 2004)
 Bethlehem
 Mount Maunganui
 Papamoa
 Welcome Bay
 Rotorua (1962, merged into Rotorua District, 1979)
 Gisborne (1955)
 Napier (1950)
 Hastings (1956)
 Wanganui (1924) (merged with surrounding counties to become Whanganui District, 1989)
 Palmerston North (1930)
 Wellington
 Wellington (1870)
 Upper Hutt (1966)
 Lower Hutt (1941)
 Porirua (1965)
 South Island
 Nelson (1874)
 Christchurch (1868)
 Timaru (1948)
 Dunedin (1865)
 Invercargill (1930)

See also
List of cities in Oceania by population
List of New Zealand urban areas by population
List of towns in New Zealand
Territorial authorities of New Zealand
List of cities and towns in the South Island
List of cities and towns in the South Island by population
City status in the United Kingdom

Notes

References
 Gordon McLauchlan (ed.), Illustrated Encyclopedia of New Zealand, The, Auckland: David Bateman, 1989 (second edition) – confirmation, pre-1989 dates

External links 
 Statistics New Zealand Subnational Population Estimates
 Tauranga status change, 2003 – specific details
 Local Government (Tauranga City Council) Order 2003 (Governor-General's Order-in-Council, 2 October 2003)
 Local Government Commission press release (PDF)
 Local Government Commission decision full text (PDF)
 Tauranga's city status returns (The New Zealand Herald, 12 August 2003)
 Local Government Online Limited site  – confirmation, post-1989 council names

 Cities
New Zealand, List of cities in
Cities in New Zealand
New Zealand